Pseudogobiopsis is a genus of fish in the goby family, Gobiidae. They are native to fresh and brackish waters of southern and southeastern Asia. The genus is mainly distinguished by the number and arrangement of fin rays and spines, headpores, and sensory papillae, the large mouths of the males, a fleshy or bony flange on the pectoral girdle, and the shape of the genital papilla.

Species
There are currently five recognized species in this genus:

 Pseudogobiopsis festivus Larson, 2009
 Pseudogobiopsis lumbantobing Larson, Hadiaty & Hubert, 2017
 Pseudogobiopsis oligactis (Bleeker, 1875) – bigmouth stream goby
 Pseudogobiopsis paludosus (Herre, 1940)
 Pseudogobiopsus rubrimaculosa G. R. Allen & Larson, 2020
 Pseudogobiopsis tigrellus (Nichols, 1951) – tiger goby

References

 
Taxa named by Frederik Petrus Koumans
Gobionellinae